Donald Knight is the name of:

 Donald Knight (cricketer) (1894–1960), English cricketer
 Donald Knight (figure skater) (born 1947), Canadian figure skater
 Don Knight (actor) (1933–1997), English movie, television, and stage actor
 Don Knight (politician) (born 1942), Canadian politician
 Don Knight (Manitoba politician)